The Kel-Tec PLR-16 is a gas-operated, semi-automatic pistol version of the SU-16, chambered in 5.56 NATO, manufactured by Kel-Tec Industries of Florida.

The PLR (Pistol, Long Range) was designed for recreational target shooting, and small game, varmint, or predator hunting.  Due to the PLR's  barrel, the 5.56×45mm bullet's velocity is slightly reduced compared to its velocity from a traditionally  barrel.

The PLR-16 combines the multi-lug rotating bolt design and breech-locking system of the AR-15 with a gas piston system.  The pistol accepts the same STANAG magazine that is used in the M-16, AR-15, and other NATO rifles chambered for 5.56×45mm.

The PLR-16's frame is constructed of reinforced polymer, making the pistol both durable and light-weight.  The frame incorporates an M-1913-style Picatinny rail molded to the top of the receiver to accept various optical sights.

See also
 Carbon 15

References

External links
Kel-Tec PLR-16
Kel-Tec's Owner's Group & Online Forum
Review of the Kel-Tec PLR-16 from American Rifleman
Kel-Tec PLR-16 5.56mm Semi-Auto Pistol

5.56 mm firearms
Semi-automatic pistols